Ponnam Prabhakar (born 8 May 1967) is an Indian politician and was a member of 15th Lok Sabha.He is the Working President of Telangana Pradesh Congress Committee. He belongs to Indian National Congress and represented the Karimnagar constituency of Andhra Pradesh. He was the youngest Member of Parliament who represented Karimnagar constituency between 2009-14.

Having been one of the prominent leaders in Telangana with a towering popularity among the masses, Ponnam Prabhakar has started his journey as a student activist. A natural leader and activist, he was known for his dynamic leadership and passion for the welfare of the society right from his student days.

Deeply rooted in the local political scene of Karimnagar, Ponnam Prabhakar has become the saviour of the distressed folk and his growing popularity was the testament. He was elected as Member of Parliament in 15th Lok Sabha Elections with a thumping majority of more than 50,000 votes. The man of masses had started his reign and quickly.

Positions Held
Youngest Member of Parliament in 15th Lok Sabha from Telangana Region.

Consultative Committee Member of Ministry of Railways and Power.

Member of National Committees on Chemicals, Fertilizers, and Computers.

Chairman of AP Markfed.

Political career
A student leader from his college days, he became Union President of SRR Government Degree and PG College during 1987-1988. He served as district General Secretary of National Students' Union of India (NSUI) from 1987 to 1989. He was also the Convenor of the District Colleges of Karimnagar from 1987 to 1988. He held the position of NSUI State Secretary from 1989 to 1991 and followed by District President of NSUI from 1992 to 1998. He later was elected again as NSUI State President from 1999 to 2002.

By 2002, Prabhakar was immensely popular among youth and masses alike. He was entrusted with Media co-ordination responsibilities for then Andhra Pradesh Congress Party and served as General Secretary for Youth Congress. He was subsequently made DCMS President and Chairman of Markfed. AP State Co-operative Marketing Federation Ltd. (Markfed) was running in losses before his appointment and Prabhakar guru with his meticulous efforts transformed it into a high-profit company winning rave accolades from senior leaders.

He worked as General Secretary of State Youth Congress from 2002 to 2003 and then, worked as Pradesh Congress Committee Media Cell Coordinator from 2002 to 2004. He was made DCMS President and later Chairman of State Markfed. As chairman of the Markfed, he had served at best and raised the loss running cooperative company to a highly profit making company with his efforts and  held the post till he contested Lok Sabha elections in 2009. He was elected as member of parliament to enter 15th Lok Sabha in 2009 on Indian National Congress (INC) ticket. He was a member for various parliamentary committees. He was one of the active participants in Telangana Movement, which gave the people of India a fruitful Telangana State.

References

External links

https://web.archive.org/web/20090807065242/http://ponnamonline.com/profile.aspx
http://www.jeetegakaun.in/general_elections_2009/parliamentary_constituencies/andhra_pradesh/karimnagar/congress/ponnam_prabhakar.php
http://www.ponnamprabhakar.com/

http://www.telugufire.com/index.php?option=com_content&view=article&id=216:ponnam-prabhakar-&catid=40:politics&directory=76

India MPs 2009–2014
People from Telangana
Telangana politicians
Living people
1967 births
Lok Sabha members from Andhra Pradesh
People from Karimnagar district